Shamai Davidson (1926–1986) was an Israeli professor, psychiatrist and psychoanalyst, who spent 30 years working with Holocaust survivors, trying to understand the nature of their experience. He was Medical Director of Shalvata Mental Health Center and served as Head of the Elie Wiesel Chair for the Study of the Psycho-Social Trauma of the Holocaust.

Born in Dublin, Davidson lost many of his relatives in the Warsaw Ghetto, Łódź Ghetto, and the gas vans of Chelmno. He studied medicine at the University of Glasgow and in Oxford University Medical School. In 1979 he became the co-founder of the Institute on the Holocaust and Genocide along with Israel W. Charny and Elie Wiesel, and worked as a psychiatrist and psychoanalyst, treating Holocaust survivors, until his death.

Davidson is best known for his work Holding on to Humanity which he started in 1972. According to the Jerusalem Post, "In this intensely fascinating book, Davidson succeeds in conveying a systematic understanding of trauma and survival as a whole, while emphasizing individual difference."

References

External links
Holding on to Humanity: Message of Holocaust Survivors - The Shamai Davidson Papers at Amazon.com
Davidson's Biography

 

1926 births
1986 deaths
Historians of the Holocaust
20th-century Israeli Jews
Israeli psychiatrists
Medical doctors from Dublin (city)
Israeli academics
Israeli psychoanalysts
20th-century Israeli historians
Irish emigrants to Israel